Mariola Fuentes (born 1970, Marbella) is a Spanish actress.

She usually plays tragicomical characters. She started to be known in 1997, thanks to her role in  Perdona bonita, pero Lucas me quería a mí. In 1998, her role in the TVE1 series A las once en casa was very popular.

Films 
Chuecatown (2007)
Volando voy (2006)
La vida perra de Juanita Narboni (2005) 
Trileros (2003) 
¡Descongélate! (2003) 
Dos tipos duros (2003) 
Hotel Danubio (2003) 
Poniente (2002) 
Hable con ella (2002) 
El cielo abierto (2001)
Sexo por compasión (2000) 
Las buenas intenciones (2000) 
Manolito Gafotas (1999) 
O me quieres o me mato (1999) 
La primera noche de mi vida (1998)
El grito en el cielo (1998)
Torrente, el brazo tonto de la ley (1998)
Insomnio (1998)
Carne trémula (1997)  
¿De qué se ríen las mujeres? (1997) 
Perdona bonita, pero Lucas me quería a mí (1997) 
Chevrolet (1997) 
Días contados (1994)

External links

1970 births
Living people
People from Marbella
Spanish film actresses
Spanish television actresses
20th-century Spanish actresses
21st-century Spanish actresses